Lachenalia ensifolia is a species of flowering plant in the genus Lachenalia, native to the Cape Provinces of South Africa. Its nominate subspecies Lachenalia ensifolia subsp. ensifolia has gained the Royal Horticultural Society's Award of Garden Merit.

Subspecies
The following subspecies are currently accepted:
Lachenalia ensifolia subsp. ensifolia
Lachenalia ensifolia subsp. maughanii (W.F.Barker) G.D.Duncan

References

ensifolia
Endemic flora of South Africa
Plants described in 2003